The 2020 All-Australian team represents the best performed Australian Football League (AFL) players during the 2020 season. It was announced on 24 September as a complete Australian rules football team of 22 players. The team is honorary and does not play any games.

Selection panel
The selection panel for the 2020 All-Australian team consisted of chairman Gillon McLachlan, Kevin Bartlett, Luke Darcy, Steve Hocking, Glen Jakovich, Chris Johnson, Cameron Ling, Matthew Richardson and Warren Tredrea.

Team

Initial squad
The initial 40-man All-Australian squad was announced on 22 September.  and  each had the most players selected in the initial squad, with five, while  and  each had four. Ten players from the 2019 team were among those selected.

Final team
Geelong, Port Adelaide, West Coast and the  each had the most selections with three, with eleven clubs represented overall. Geelong midfielder Patrick Dangerfield, who achieved his record-equalling eighth All-Australian selection, was announced as the All-Australian captain, with former Port Adelaide captain Travis Boak announced as vice-captain. The team saw twelve players selected in an All-Australian team for the first time in their careers, while seven players from the 2019 team were among those selected.

Note: the position of coach in the All-Australian team is traditionally awarded to the coach of the premiership team.

References

All-Australian team